Lynn Anderson's Greatest Hits, Volume II is a compilation album by American country artist Lynn Anderson. It was released in September 1976 via Columbia Records and was produced by Glenn Sutton. It was Anderson's third compilation release for the Columbia label and second "greatest hits" package for the company. The album contained some of her biggest hits for the label in the 1970s.

Background, content and release
Lynn Anderson's Greatest Hits, Volume II contained some of Anderson's biggest hits from her years at Columbia Records. The album was derived from the success of her first greatest hits package in 1972. These songs on the package were first recorded between 1972 and 1976. They were all previously released on studio albums during that period. All of the album's tracks were first produced by Glenn Sutton, whom was also Anderson's husband at the time. The album contained ten tracks. All of the tracks were previously singles for Anderson. This included the number one country hits "What a Man My Man Is" and "Keep Me in Mind." The album also featured the top five country hits "Top of the World" and "Sing About Love". Additional featured tracks were top 20 hits, such as "He Turns It into Love Again" and "I've Never Loved Anyone More."

Lynn Anderson's Greatest Hits, Volume Two was released in September 1976 on Columbia Records. It was Anderson's third compilation to be released on the Columbia label. It was issued as a vinyl LP, containing five songs on each side of the record. The album spent a total of five weeks on the Billboard Top Country Albums list. In November 1976, it peaked at number 41 on the country albums chart. Because it contained all previously-released material, no new singles were spawned from the compilation.

Track listing

Personnel
All credits are adapted from the liner notes of Lynn Anderson's Greatest Hits.

Musical and technical personnel
 Lynn Anderson – lead vocals
 Bill Barnes – album design
 Alan Clayton – photography
 Slick Lawson – photography
 Glenn Sutton – producer

Chart performance

Release history

References

1976 greatest hits albums
Albums produced by Glenn Sutton
Columbia Records albums
Lynn Anderson compilation albums